The 1944 Tulane Green Wave football team represented Tulane University as a member of the Southeastern Conference (SEC) during the 1944 college football season. Led by third-year head coach Claude Simons Jr., the Green Wave played their home games at Tulane Stadium in New Orleans. Tulane finished the season with an overall record of 4–3 and a mark of 1–2 in conference play, placing eighth in the SEC.

Schedule

References

Tulane
Tulane Green Wave football seasons
Tulane Green Wave football